Kevin Laurence Fisher is a New Zealand former rugby league footballer, coach and manager who represented New Zealand in the 1977 World Cup.

Playing career
A Huntly South player in the Waikato Rugby League, Fisher was also a Waikato representative.

He was first selected for New Zealand in 1977, and participated at the World Cup that year. Fisher went on the 1980 New Zealand rugby league tour of Great Britain and France and the tour to Australia and Papua New Guinea in 1982. He played a total of eight test matches between 1977 and 1982.

Later years
His son, Darryl, played for Waikato in 1996 and the Western Suburbs Magpies in 1998.

In 1997 Fisher coached Huntly South.

He managed Northern Districts in 2001 against France.

He also went on to manage the Junior Kiwis in both 2001 and 2002 in games against Australia.

References

Living people
New Zealand rugby league players
New Zealand national rugby league team players
Waikato rugby league team players
New Zealand rugby league coaches
New Zealand rugby league administrators
Rugby league wingers
Rugby league hookers
Year of birth missing (living people)